The Pennsylvania Canal (or sometimes Pennsylvania Canal system) was a complex system of transportation infrastructure improvements including canals, dams, locks, tow paths, aqueducts, and viaducts.  The Canal and Works were constructed and assembled over several decades beginning in 1824, the year of the first enabling act and budget items.<ref
 group=notes>The political push to create the system was inspired by competition with New York and Baltimore, all three vying to be the premier major port city, and in particular, the continuing construction of the Erie Canal, begun in 1817. The news that construction of the Erie was expected on schedule, in 1825 added fuel to what had become a frenzy. The Erie began operations on October 26, 1825, further inspiring Pennsylvanians to over achieve in the Great Works projects. Portaging over the Alleghenies by 1834 was one result, though the Delaware Canal project was delayed to fund the western infrastructure connecting Allegheny County to the Center and Eastern state.</ref>  It should be understood the first use of any railway in North America was the year 1826, so the newspapers and the Pennsylvania Assembly of 1824 applied the term then to the proposed rights of way mainly for the canals of the Main Line of Public Works to be built across the southern part of Pennsylvania.

Enacted while railroads were in their infancy, the focus of the act was to create, via a canal system, the capability to ship heavy or bulk goods and connect Philadelphia to Pittsburgh and, more importantly, beyond to the new growth markets in the developing Northwest Territory reached by the Ohio River, now called the Midwest.<ref
 group=notes>City fathers in New York and Baltimore were undertaking similar actions to build their states' future commerce, resulting in the proposal and company formed to build a canal from Baltimore to the Monongahela and another across Ohio—that determination would spawn the B&O Railroad. In New York the financial and political scheming to get a lock on the emerging Midwest markets would begin with the Erie Canal and work up through the Delaware and Hudson Canal and, not long after, the New York Central Railroad.</ref>

When updated in 1837 to reflect the experience of twelve years of toddler-railways,<ref
 group=notes>Several key early railroads were added later in 1837 after word of early British successes reached the United states, and the first group of rail lines begun in the US (1826–1828) proved their worth.</ref> the term was also applied to railroads and new canals to be added to the state transportation system.<ref
 name=PHMC></ref>  As a crowning achievement, the Main Line of Public Works and the Pennsylvania Canal system topped  in elevation by erecting the Allegheny Portage Railroad, which used a system of five inclines and five planes on each side of the Eastern Continental Divide at Cresson Pass in Cambria County to actually haul wheeled flat cars, which had halved canal boats placed on them, up and over the Allegheny Front and connect Pittsburgh to the Susquehanna. When finished in 1834 the trip from Philadelphia to Pittsburgh could be made in 3–5 days, weather conditions depending.

Background
The near west, in the fifty years before 1830 was but recently settled and steadily growing as people poured westwards along the various Emigrant Trails into the mid-west to destinations on a million new farms and towns throughout the watershed of the Mississippi Valley towards the lands organized in the Northwest Territory.  The goal of the enabling acts was to enhance commerce and lower transportation costs between east and west, better joining the trans-Allegheny region to the eastern seaboard; this was a commercially motivated act with an eye towards servicing the growing markets of the new fast growing western settlements (Midwest) to the manufactories of the East.

Provision was made in the later legislation to tie in and even extend privately built canals such as the Lehigh Canal, not technically part of the Pennsylvania Canal system, and link them and the state's infant railroads to the public system and add to its value. The canal linking Philadelphia to the Susquehanna River, the proposed Pennsylvania Canal (Philadelphia to the Susquehanna to the Wright's Ferry landing at Columbia, Pennsylvania), was overtaken by technological events. Instead of pouring money into building a ditch, permission was sought by the investors to use its  right of way to replace it in the "main line of works" scheme by a railway, a new developing technology which resulted in the Philadelphia & Columbia Railroad (1834). As they were built above ground, railways were easier and cheaper to build, since no ditches needed to be dug with human muscle power, nor did they require feed waters to be located and aqueducts built to provide them. The plan also included a visionary scheme to build a ramp system which would roll canal boats over the Allegheny Mountains at an elevation over  through the broad uneven saddle of Cresson Pass.

Though most of the canals no longer have any function, some segments retain value as historic and recreational sites. Both the Delaware and the lower Lehigh Canal were kept busy into the tough financial years of the Great Depression. The first three tunnels of any kind in the US were built in support of the Allegheny Portage Railway,<ref
 name=NatPSstaple> They were also converted into railway tunnels in 1854 when the Pennsylvania Railroad bought the Allegheny Portage Railway from the Commonwealth of Pennsylvania.</ref> and all of them were converted to railroad tunnels.

History

The canal era began in Pennsylvania in 1797 with the Conewago Canal, which carried riverboats around Conewago Falls on the Susquehanna River near York Haven. Spurred by construction of the Erie Canal (construction between 1817 and 1825) and the perceived competitive advantage it would give New York State in moving people and materials to and from the interior of the continent, Pennsylvanians built hundreds of miles of canals during the early decades of the 19th century. These included the privately funded Lehigh Canal, technically a navigation (1818) improving water transport on the lower Lehigh River (Mauch Chunk to Easton at the confluence with the Delaware via Allentown and Bethlehem) and enabling the first regular reliable supplies of anthracite coal to reach eastern manufactories and two canals built later by Pennsylvania stock companies, the Schuylkill Canal from Philadelphia to Port Carbon and the Union Canal from Reading to Middletown.

Though not all in concurrent operation, the total length of the canals built in Pennsylvania eventually reached .

By 1840, work had been completed not only on the Main Line of Public Works but on many other lines, officially called divisions. The Main Line consisted of the Eastern Division, the Juniata Division, the Western Division, the Philadelphia and Columbia Railroad, and the Allegheny Portage Railroad. North–south divisions operated along the Delaware River in the east, the Susquehanna River in the middle of the state, and the Beaver River in the west. A few additions were completed after 1840.

By about 1850 steam engine technology had advanced to having the ability to produce locomotives with sufficient power to move freight, including bulk goods such as coal and grain, so railroads had already begun displacing canals as the preferred method of long-distance transportation, as they also offered speed. In 1852, the Pennsylvania Railroad (PRR) began offering rail service from Philadelphia to Pittsburgh, and in 1857, it bought the Main Line Canal from the state. In 1859, all canals owned by the commonwealth were sold. The PRR formed the Pennsylvania Canal Company in 1867 and continued to use canals to haul freight. The canal business, however, declined steadily in the last quarter of the century, and most Pennsylvania canals no longer functioned after 1900.

State built
The state funded the following canals in Pennsylvania. For interstate canals, the listed mileage is for the Pennsylvania portion only.

Pennsylvania Main Line Canal
 Eastern Division-Pennsylvania Canal, Columbia to Clarks Ferry, 
 Juniata Division-Pennsylvania Canal, Juniata Aqueduct to Hollidaysburg, 
 Western Division-Pennsylvania Canal, Johnstown to Pittsburgh, 
 Allegheny Outlet-Pennsylvania Canal, Western Division to Allegheny River, 
 Kittanning Feeder, Kittanning to Western Division,

Susquehanna network
 These canals are all connected directly to branches of the Susquehanna River, and most are technically Navigations.
 Pennsylvania Canal (Susquehanna Division), Clarks Ferry to Northumberland, 
 Pennsylvania Canal (West Branch Division), Northumberland to Farrandsville, 
 Pennsylvania Canal (North Branch Division), Northumberland to New York State line, 
 Wiconisco Canal, Clarks Ferry to Millersburg, 
 Lewisburg Cut, West Branch Division to Lewisburg, 
 Bald Eagle Cut, West Branch Division through Lock Haven to Bald Eagle Creek,

Beaver and Erie
 Beaver Division, Ohio River at Beaver to Pulaski, 
 Shenango Division, Pulaski to Conneaut Lake, 
 Conneaut Division, Conneaut to Erie, 
 French Creek Feeder, Meadville to Conneaut Lake, 
 Franklin Line, French Creek Feeder to Franklin,

Delaware
 Delaware Division, Easton to Bristol,

Privately built
Private entities, including foreign investors, funded the following canals in Pennsylvania. For interstate canals, the listed mileage is for the Pennsylvania portion only.
 Bald Eagle and Spring Creek Navigation Canal, Bellefonte to Bald Eagle Cut, 
 Codorus Navigation, York to Susquehanna River, 
 Conestoga Navigation, Lancaster to Susquehanna River, 
 Conewago Canal, around Conewago Falls on Susquehanna, 
 Delaware and Hudson Canal, Honesdale to Roundout, New York, 
 Lehigh Canal, White Haven to Easton, Grand Canal  (1848-1862) The Lehigh was built in two stages, the lower canal running  built in 1818-1820 connected the coal fields from the slack water pool at Mauch Chunk to Easton on the Delaware. There it provided coal to the Delaware & Raritan Canal (to New York City, Princeton, & Trenton), the Delaware Canal to Philadelphia, and by conveyance on the Delaware River to oceanic shipping vessels. At the top trains descended by gravity to the new extended canal head at White Haven and returned by locomotive propulsion.
 Junction Canal, Athens to Elmira, New York, 
 Leiper Canal, Crum Creek near Chester, several miles
 Monongahela Navigation Company
 Muncy Cut, Muncy to West Branch Susquehanna, 
 Pennsylvania and Ohio Canal, New Castle to Akron, Ohio, 
 Pine Grove Feeder, Union Canal to Pine Grove, 
 Sandy and Beaver Canal, Glasgow to Bolivar, Ohio, 
 Schuylkill Canal, Port Carbon to Philadelphia, 
 Susquehanna and Tidewater Canal, Columbia to Havre de Grace, Maryland, 
 Union Canal, Reading to Middletown,  successor to the Schuylkill and Susquehanna Navigation Company

Parks, monuments, historic places
Several canal segments or other canal infrastructure in Pennsylvania are listed on the National Register of Historic Places. One complete canal, the Delaware Canal, is the main feature of Delaware Canal State Park (formerly Theodore Roosevelt State Park) between Bristol and Easton.

Other Pennsylvania canal infrastructure on the National Register includes the following:
 Allegheny Portage Railroad, from Johnstown to Hollidaysburg, which is both a National Historic Site and a National Historic Landmark.  The portage railroad begins where the canal ends in Hollidaysburg.  This site is now the home of the Canal Basin Park.
 D & H Canal Company office, scenic drive, northwest side of Lackawaxen Township
 Juniata Division,  of canal between the Pennsylvania Railroad main line and the Juniata River in Granville Township
 Leesport Lock House, a Lockhouse on the Schuylkill Canal in Leesport
 Lehigh Canal, Allentown to Hopeville section, Lehigh River near Bethlehem
 Lehigh Canal, Carbon County section along Lehigh River, Weissport and vicinity
 Lehigh Canal, Glendon and Abbott Street Industrial Sites, Lehigh River from Hopeville to confluence of Lehigh and Delaware Rivers near Easton
 Lehigh Canal, Lehigh Gap to South Walnutport boundary
 Lehigh Canal, Walnutport to Allentown section, Allentown and vicinity
 Schuylkill Navigation Canal, Oakes Reach section, north and east bank of Schuylkill River from Pennsylvania Route 113 to Lock 61
 Union Canal Tunnel, west of Lebanon off Pennsylvania Route 72
 West Branch Division, canal and Limestone Run aqueduct, Milton
 Western Division, canal north of Torrance in Westmoreland County
 Western Division, canal along the Conemaugh River near Robinson

See also
 List of canals in the United States
 National Canal Museum, Easton, Pennsylvania

Notes

References

External links
 Pennsylvania Canal Society
 American Canal Society
 National Canal Museum

 
Canals on the National Register of Historic Places in Pennsylvania
Canals in Pennsylvania
Transportation buildings and structures in Pittsburgh
19th-century establishments in Pennsylvania
19th-century disestablishments in Pennsylvania
National Register of Historic Places in Pittsburgh